Ronald or Ron Brown may refer to:

Politicians
Ron Brown (Australian politician) (1915–1992), Tasmanian politician
Ronald Brown (English politician) (1921–2002), British Member of Parliament for Hackney South and Shoreditch
Ron Brown (Scottish politician) (1940–2007), former Member of Parliament for Leith
Ron Brown (1941–1996), United States Secretary of Commerce
Ron Brown (Wisconsin politician) (born 1946), Wisconsin legislator

Sport
Ron Brown (footballer) (1923–1968), Northern Irish footballer
Ron Brown (cricketer) (1924–2008), New Zealand cricketer
Ron Brown (wide receiver) (born 1961), American football player and Olympic athlete
Ron Brown (linebacker) (born 1964), American football player
Ronald Brown (rugby union) (born 1995), South African rugby player

Others
Ronald Brown (bishop) (1926–2019), Bishop of Birkenhead
Ronald Drayton Brown (1927–2008), Australian chemist
Ronald Brown (mathematician) (born 1935), British mathematician
Ron Brown (Australian public servant), Australian public servant
Ronald K. Brown (born 1967), American dancer and choreographer

See also
Ronnie Brown (disambiguation)